Protocadherin 19 is a protein belonging to the protocadherin family, which is part of the large cadherin superfamily of cell-adhesion proteins. The PCDH19 gene encoding the protein is located on the long arm of the X chromosome.

Clinical significance
Mutations of the PCDH19 gene cause epilepsy-intellectual disability in females. According to a review published in 2021, PCDH19 was one of the six genes most often affected in genetic epilepsies.

History 
The PCDH19 gene that encodes the protein was first cloned in 2000 by Nagase et al. In 2008, PCDH19 was identified as the gene responsible for the development of epilepsy-intellectual disability in females, and in the years that have passed since, rare cases were found of males affected by this disease.

References 

Cell adhesion proteins
Cadherins